Paul Falconer Poole  (1807–1879) was a British subject and genre painter. Though self-taught, his fine feeling for colour, poetic sympathy, and dramatic power gained Poole a high position among British artists.

Early life 
Paul Falconer Poole was born on 28 December 1807 at 43 College Street in Bristol, England, the fourth son of James Paul Poole, a Bristol coal merchant.

Career 
Poole exhibited his first work in the Royal Academy at the age of twenty-five, the subject being The Well, a scene in Naples. There was an interval of seven years before he next exhibited his Farewell, Farewell in 1837, which was followed by the Emigrant's Departure, Hermann and Dorothea and By the Waters of Babylon. In 1843, his position was made secure by his Solomon Eagle, and by his success in the Cartoon Exhibition, in which he received from the Fine Art Commissioners a prize of £300 sterling.

After his exhibition of the Surrender of Syon House, he was elected an associate of the Royal Academy in 1846, and was made an academician in 1861. In the 1850s, he lived at 43 Camden Road Villas (now 203 Camden Rd) near Camden Town.

Personal life 
Poole was a close friend of landscape artist Thomas Danby (c. 1818–1886) with whom he shared a house in Hampstead, London for a time.

Death 

Poole died on the 22nd September 1879 and was buried on the eastern side of Highgate Cemetery.

References 
Citations

Sources

External links 

 
 P F Poole online (ArtCyclopedia)
 Works by P F Poole (Bridgeman Art Gallery)
 Profile on Royal Academy of Arts Collections
 

19th-century English painters
English male painters
British genre painters
Artists from Bristol
1806 births
1879 deaths
Burials at Highgate Cemetery
Royal Academicians
19th-century English male artists